Rencontre or La Rencontre may refer to:

 Rencontre East, Newfoundland and Labrador, Canada
 Rencontre West, Newfoundland and Labrador, Canada
 La rencontre imprévue, a 1763 opera by Gluck
 Diogenes and Alexander (La rencontre  d'Alexandre et de Diogène de Sinope), a Puget bas relief
 La rencontre, an 1854 painting by Gustave Courbet nicknamed "Bonjour, Monsieur Courbet"
 Rencontre (Maupassant), title of two short stories from 1882 and 1884 by Guy de Maupassant
La Rencontre, album by Emmanuel Moire 2015